Seatrain was an American roots fusion band based initially in Marin County, California, and later in Marblehead, Massachusetts.  Seatrain was formed in 1969, subsequently drawing some members from the Blues Project when it broke up. Seatrain recorded four albums and disbanded in 1973.

Band history
Flutist/bassist Andy Kulberg and drummer Roy Blumenfeld of Blues Project formed the band with Jim Roberts, ex-Mystery Trend guitarist John Gregory, former Blue Grass Boy and Jim Kweskin Jug Band violinist/fiddler Richard Greene, and saxophonist Don Kretmar. Seatrain recorded their first album, Planned Obsolescence, in 1968, but had to release it as a Blues Project album for contractual reasons. In 1969, they released a self-titled LP (Sea Train), but faced a major change in membership a few months later.

The group's second self-titled album was released in late 1970 under the single-word name Seatrain. By then, Blumenfeld, Gregory, and Kretmar had been replaced by drummer Larry Atamanuik, keyboardist Lloyd Baskin, and Earth Opera guitarist and former Blue Grass Boy Peter Rowan. The album's "13 Questions" was released as a single and became a minor hit in the US, reaching #49 on Billboard'''s national chart in 1971.

George Martin produced the album, marking the first time he had acted in that capacity with a rock act since his work with the Beatles. He also produced Seatrain's much-anticipated 1971 follow-up album, The Marblehead Messenger. In September Seatrain toured Great Britain for the first time, usually performing as a support act for Traffic. However, Rowan and Greene left the band soon after to form Muleskinner, while Roberts and Atamanuik joined the backing band of Emmylou Harris. Kulberg and Baskin replaced these members with guitarist Peter Walsh, keyboardist Bill Elliott, and drummer Julio Coronado, but released only one more album, 1973's Watch.

Line-ups
Source:

1968–1969
 John Gregory – guitars, vocals
 Don Kretmar – saxophone, bass
 Richard Greene – violin
 Andy Kulberg – bass, flute
 Roy Blumenfeld – drums
 Jim Roberts – lyricist

1969
 Don Kretmar – saxophone, bass
 Richard Greene – violin
 Andy Kulberg – bass, flute
 Jim Roberts – lyricist
 Red Shepherd – vocals
 Teddy Irwin – guitars
 Bobby Moses – drums

1969
 Don Kretmar – saxophone, bass
 Richard Greene – violin
 Andy Kulberg – bass, flute
 Red Shepherd – vocals
 Elliot Randall – guitars
 Billy Williams – drums

1969–1972
 Richard Greene – violin
 Andy Kulberg – bass, flute
 Peter Rowan – guitars, vocals
 Lloyd Baskin – keyboards, vocals
 Larry Atamanuik – drums

1972–1973
 Andy Kulberg – bass, vocals, flute
 Lloyd Baskin – keyboards, vocals
 Peter Walsh – guitars
 Bill Elliott – keyboards
 Julio Coronado – drums

Discography
 Sea Train (1969)
 Seatrain (1970)
 The Marblehead Messenger (1971)
 Watch'' (1973)

References

External links
 Seatrain Discography
 Album Reviews (The Blues Project and Seatrain)
 Fan site detailing the band at various stages of its existence.

American jazz ensembles
Marblehead, Massachusetts
A&M Records artists
Capitol Records artists
Warner Records artists